"Welcome to Holland" is a prominent essay, written in 1987 by American author and social activist Emily Perl Kingsley, about having a child with a disability. The piece is given by many organizations to new parents of children with special needs issues such as Down syndrome. As a testament to its popularity, several individuals have received the first name "Holland".

Emily Kingsley is the mother of Jason Kingsley. The younger Kingsley is an actor who has appeared on programs such as Sesame Street and enjoyed a varied career, despite the family being told early in his childhood that his struggles would prevent him from having a meaningful life. "Welcome to Holland", written in the second person, employs a metaphor of excitement for a vacation to Italy that first becomes disappointment when the plane lands instead in Holland and then contentment at the happy events which they experience instead.

Background and contents

The metaphor is that the trip to Italy is a typical birth and child-raising experience, and that the trip to Holland is the experiencing of having and raising a child with special needs.

In the end, however, the reader sees that the "trip" is still well worth it:

Author and social activist Emily Perl Kingsley wrote the piece based on her experiences with her son, Jason Kingsley, and her changing beliefs through parenthood. The younger Kingsley was born in 1974 with Down syndrome. Their doctor labeled the child as a "mongoloid" that would fail to learn to speak or walk and instructed the parents to act essentially as if the birth hadn't happened, with the mother sent to receive tranquilizing drugs preventing lactation. She recounted that she cried for several days straight.

Although such medical attitudes were consistent with the prejudices of the time, the distraught family resisted and determined to provide the boy with as intellectually stimulating an environment as possible. Accounts of widespread abuse as a result of controversial institutionalization policies served to spur them on even more. The younger Kingsley has worked as an actor, appearing on programs such as Sesame Street, and otherwise enjoyed a varied career despite various challenges.

Responses and influence
As a testament to its popularity, several individuals have received the first name "Holland". In 2004, Will Livingston wrote a song loosely based on the story. He also used the title "Welcome to Holland".

Critical analysis of the work and its influence has compared it to poet Robert Frost's piece The Road Not Taken, which also discusses the human tendency to look back and fret about 'what might have been' after people make decisions.

A response essay describing the possible toll that parenting can take on a family's welfare, such as raising children with severe autism, was created titled "Welcome to Beirut", with the later piece alluding to the suffering from the Lebanese Civil War. "Welcome to Holland" has also attracted some amused, humorous responses from individuals living in both Holland and Italy in contrast to the original story's American perspective.

See also

Emily Perl Kingsley
The Road Not Taken

References

External links
 "Welcome to Holland"

1987 essays
Disability literature
Works about Italy
Works about the Netherlands
Works about parenting